Pak Chol-min (born 10 December 1988) is a North Korean international football player. He currently plays for April 25 of the DPR Korea Premier Football League.

Pak has appeared for the Korea DPR national football team in the 2010 FIFA World Cup qualifying rounds. He also played at the 2005 FIFA U-17 World Championship and the 2007 FIFA U-20 World Cup.

Goals for Senior National Team

References

External links

1988 births
Living people
North Korean footballers
North Korea international footballers
Rimyongsu Sports Club players
2011 AFC Asian Cup players
Footballers at the 2010 Asian Games
Association football forwards
Asian Games competitors for North Korea